"The Beast in Me" is a song by English musician Nick Lowe. The song features slow, mournful music and lyrics describing the narrator's struggle with destructive habits and personality traits: "The beast in me / Is caged by frail and fragile bars".

The recording debut for "The Beast In Me" was by American singer Johnny Cash from his American Recordings album released in April 1994. Cash was Lowe's father-in-law from 1979 to 1990, during Lowe's marriage to singer Carlene Carter. A live version of the song by Cash appears on his 2005 DVD Live at Montreux 1994.

Lowe's first recording of the song appeared in his album The Impossible Bird, released in November 1994. A live version by Lowe appears on his 2004 live album Untouched Takeaway.

Covers

Appearances in other media
The Lowe studio version of the song features over the closing credits of the pilot episode of US television show The Sopranos. The song features on the commercially available soundtrack CD. Johnny Cash's version also appears in the 2011 film The Hangover: Part II but Mark Lanegan did a version for the soundtrack.

Melwood Cutlery's version of the song features over the closing credits of Project Grizzly, a 1996 National Film Board documentary about Canadian inventor, Troy Hurtubise and his quest to create a suit in which to meet a Grizzly Bear.

The Lowe version plays over the closing credits of season 2's episode 6, of the Epix series 'Get Shorty' and of episode 3 of the 2023 BBC serial about the 1983 Brink's-Mat robbery and its aftermath, The Gold.

References

Johnny Cash songs
Songs written by Nick Lowe
1994 songs
Nick Lowe songs